San Roque de Riomiera is a municipality located in the autonomous community of Cantabria, Spain.

Localities

 La Concha.
 Merilla.
 La Pedrosa (Capital).

References

Municipalities in Cantabria